ScribbleLive was a content cloud provider used by brands, sports, and media companies. It was based in Toronto.

History 
ScribbleLive was a privately owned company founded by Michael De Monte and Jonathan Keebler in 2008 to provide a live blogging software platform. The company has since evolved into a content marketing software company with data science capabilities. De Monte and Keebler were both employees at CTV when they started working on what would eventually become ScribbleLive, investing $1,500 into the initial project.

In 2009, De Monte and Keebler received seed funding from Rogers Ventures.

In 2009, Michael De Monte and Jonathan Keebler appeared on Dragon's Den.  They received $250 000 Canadian from three Dragon's while giving up 30% of their company to them.

On November 10, 2011, ScribbleLive announced that it had raised $4 million in new financing, led by Summerhill Venture Partners.

ScribbleLive announced a second round of funding on June 19, 2013. This round of funding was led by Georgian Partners and included Export Development Canada (EDC), Summerhill Venture Partners, and Rogers Venture Partners. In January 2014, Vince Mifsud was appointed the new CEO of ScribbleLive.

On June 14, 2014, Scribble Technologies Inc. acquired CoveritLive from Demand Media for $4.5 (USD) million of cash and promissory note with a principal amount of $5.6 million.

On April 15, 2015, Scribble Technologies Inc. acquired Appinions Inc.

On January 30, 2016, ScribbleLive formally acquired Visually, the leading platform for premium content creation.

On August 23, ScribbleLive announced that it has acquired SEO company Linkdex.

In December 2019, Scribblelive was acquired by Rock Content, a Brazilian content marketing company headquartered in Belo Horizonte with offices in Boca Raton, Canada, and Mexico.

Features 
The browser-based application allows users to post and edit content, insert images and video, create polls, provide comments, moderate and curate the social web. Content can be published via the web, SMS text messaging, and voicemail. The application has also been used for Q&A sessions and live chats. Each event is archived and real-time analytics generate statistics on the event's coverage.

The platform allows for collaboration between different parts of an organization, by allowing writers and editors to publish and edit content simultaneously.

Social content is also curated through the application. Relevant Twitter hashtags or users can be followed in a live blog, posting their content from Twitter as it is created. Content from Facebook can also be pulled in, although the amount of accessible conversations is lower due to the social network's privacy policies.

On June 1, 2015, ScribbleLive released Projects so that content marketers and publishers can create content plans collaboratively. Other project features include content calendars, content promotion scheduling, and content analytics.

On March 17, 2016, ScribbleLive formally launched its new Plan product. The new service includes an advanced workflow feature that coordinates messaging and content across various platforms. ScribbleLive Plan will "ensure that every piece of content, whether it’s a single tweet or webinar series, is aligned to the same goals, focused on the right personas and working as efficiently as possible to move the needle."

On May 3, 2016, ScribbleLive announced key updates to its Engage product. The update includes a redesigned main interface (referred to as the Content Studio), enhancements to the product's core curation tool, and the introduction of a new and advanced Moderation Hub.

Event coverage 

During the Egyptian Revolution, Al Jazeera was faced with multiple attempts to disrupt its coverage from Egypt. ScribbleLive set up a phone number that enabled Al Jazeera reporters to call in and leave audio messages on Al Jazeera's liveblog. Reporters had to resort to phoning in live updates to their Al Jazeera's liveblog, "to overcome the internet blackout and restrictions on its journalists, Al Jazeera was publishing audio messages from its correspondents in Egypt, powered by live-blogging platform ScribbleLive."

When the 2011 Tohoku earthquake and tsunami hit Japan, Reuters.com used ScribbleLive to send live updates to their users, including news, videos, and photos from their journalists.

References

Defunct software companies of Canada
Software companies established in 2008
2008 establishments in Ontario
Software companies disestablished in 2019
2019 disestablishments in Ontario
2019 mergers and acquisitions